"Flame" is a song recorded by American singer Tinashe, released on March 16, 2017 as the intended first single from her third studio album Joyride, but was later scrapped until it became featured on the Japanese edition for the album. The song was produced by Sir Nolan, who wrote the track with Tinashe, alongside Simon Wilcox, Ilsey Juber, and Nasri Atweh.

Composition
"Flame" is a midtempo eighties-styled synth-pop track described as "slow burning", incorporating fluffy synthesizers and pounding drums. It marks a stylistic departure from previous singles that Tinashe released in 2016, namely "Superlove" and "Company". The song's instrumentation was compared to "Style" by Taylor Swift. Lyrically, "Flame" talks about trying to save a relationship.

Critical reception
Mike Wass of Idolator gave "Flame" a positive review, writing, "I know some fans prefer Tee in eerie, alt-R&B mode, but I appreciate her willingness to bounce between genres. And 'Flame' isn't exactly fluff either. She's still delving into matters of the heart, albeit soundtracked by a perky pop beat." He concludes his review of the single by stating: "I don't think this is as memorable as 'Company' or as effortless as "All Hands on Deck", but it probably has the widest appeal and, after a year of delays, that's the whole."

Other media
The song was chosen as a theme song for WWE's WrestleMania 33.

Music video
The music video was released on April 21, 2017. Music video was situational as last segment shown that she torched the house and set in ablaze.

Remixes
An official remix by American electronic music producer Kaskade was released on May 19, 2017.

Track listing

Charts

Release history

References

External links
 

2017 singles
2017 songs
RCA Records singles
Tinashe songs
Songs written by Tinashe
Songs written by Sir Nolan
Songs written by Simon Wilcox
Songs written by Ilsey Juber
Songs written by Nasri (musician)
Torch songs